The Serbian men's national tennis team represents Serbia in the Davis Cup and the ATP Cup, both tennis competitions.

In 2020, Serbia won the inaugural ATP Cup.

Current team
The following players are representing Serbia in the 2022 ATP Cup.

ATP rankings on 3 January 2022

Recent call-ups

The following players were part of a team in the last three years.

ATP rankings on 3 January 2022

Results

Head to head 
(by No. of ties)

 vs  2 ties 2–0
 vs  2 ties 1–1
 vs  2 ties 1–1
 vs  1 tie 1–0
 vs  1 tie 1–0
 vs  1 tie 1–0
 vs  1 tie 1–0
 vs  1 tie 0–1

Captains

See also
 Serbia Davis Cup team
 Serbia Billie Jean King Cup team

References

External links

ATP Cup
ATP Cup